The Clark air Crawler model CA-1 widely known as the Clark CA-1 was a small airborne bulldozer designed for improvement of runways in World War II by the United States Armed Forces.

Design and production 

In 1942, the United States military created a new engineering unit that would be extremely mobile; this could only be done with light equipment. The military began looking for new bulldozer small and light enough to be flown in the Douglas C-47 and the Waco CG-4A. When the parameters were set the military looked for a company to create such a machine. They were to draw inspiration from the US Forestry Service's "trail tractor" (a small tractor for use in small clearings and fields within the forest).

In 1942, the Clark Machine Company took the contract. Clark initially built 14 operational dozers and conducted extensive tests at their facilities. Once proven, the military ordered 800 more and eventually extended that figure. The War Department worked with Clark Machine over the course of the years 1942 and 1943 ordering many CA-1s by the end of World War 2. It is estimated that there were more than 2,500 produced.

Operation 

The Tractor was flown in by either a C-46 or C-47 or transported by a glider, which landed on an unimproved runway or a possible runway. Once dropped off, the engineers used the tractors to construct a paved or improved landing strip. The CA-1 would be used predominantly to tow graders and pan scrapers. This style of construction was fast and relatively efficient which gave the United States a reasonable strategic advantage in the Pacific campaign of World War 2 due to the island hopping tactic that required many new airfields. After the war a new community of people eager to restore these small and light tractor emerged.

More than 1,500 CA-1s were used by the US Army.

References

External links 
Relevant conversations
http://www.questmasters.us/Clark_CA-1.html

 
Tractors